The Central Illinois Flying Aces were a Tier I junior hockey team that played as a member of the United States Hockey League.  Based in Bloomington, Illinois, the Flying Aces played their home games at the Grossinger Motors Arena, located in downtown Bloomington.

History
From 2006 to 2014, Bloomington was home to various minor league professional hockey teams in the International Hockey League (IHL), Central Hockey League (CHL) and then the Southern Professional Hockey League (SPHL). The SPHL's Bloomington Thunder folded in April 2014 when new owners obtained the expansion rights to a Tier I junior team in the United States Hockey League. The new Bloomington USHL team obtained the rights to the name from the previous teams and became the Bloomington Thunder. Initially they kept the SPHL team's logo but rolled out a new logo and color scheme at the USHL Draft.

In 2017, the team rebranded and became the Central Illinois Flying Aces.  On February 28, 2019, the Flying Aces announced they will suspend operations for at least the 2019–20 season.

Logo history

See also
Bloomington Thunder (SPHL)

References

External links
 Official site

Ice hockey teams in Illinois
United States Hockey League teams
Central Illinois
Ice hockey clubs established in 2014
2014 establishments in Illinois